The 2007 Six days track cycling events are multi-race competitions, each taking place over six days at various locations in mainland Europe. The riders challenge each other in track cycling disciplines including the madison, track time trials, sprints, and Derny motor-paced races.

The competitions are organised by the UCI.

Results

References

Six Days